Robert Mackay  was Dean of Aberdeen and Orkney from 1922 to 1934.

He was educated at the University of Aberdeen and ordained in 1883. After a curacy at Edinburgh Cathedral he was Rector  of Longside from 1845. During World War I he was a Chaplain to the Forces. He was the Synod Clerk for the Diocese of Aberdeen and Orkney from 1910 to 1922; and a Canon of Aberdeen Cathedral from 1914 to 1922.

Notes

Alumni of the University of Aberdeen
Deans of Aberdeen and Orkney